The Pitchfork Music Festival 2022 was held on July 15 to 17, 2022 at the Union Park, Chicago, United States. The festival was headlined by Mitski, the National and the Roots.

The festival was followed by after shows in various venues around Chicago with a line-up, including L'Rain, yeule, Camp Cope, and Ethel Cain.

Lineup
Headline performers are listed in boldface. Artists listed from latest to earliest set times.

Notes

References

External links

Pitchfork Music Festival
2022 music festivals